The hydrogen economy is using hydrogen to decarbonize economic sectors which are hard to electrify, essentially, the "hard-to-abate" sectors such as cement, steel, long-haul transport, etc. In order to phase out fossil fuels and limit climate change, hydrogen can be created from water using renewable sources such as wind and solar, and its combustion only releases water vapor into the atmosphere.

Hydrogen is an energetic fuel, frequently used as rocket fuel, but numerous technical challenges prevent the creation of a large-scale hydrogen economy. These include the difficulty of developing long-term storage, pipelines, and engine equipment; a relative lack of off-the-shelf engine technology that can currently run safely on hydrogen; safety concerns regarding the high reactivity of hydrogen fuel with oxygen in ambient air; the expense of producing it by electrolysis; and a lack of efficient photochemical water splitting technology. Hydrogen can also react in a fuel cell, which efficiently produces electricity in a process that is the reverse of the electrolysis of water. The hydrogen economy is nevertheless slowly developing as a small part of the low-carbon economy.

, hydrogen is mainly used as an industrial feedstock, primarily for the production of ammonia and methanol, and in petroleum refining. Although initially hydrogen gas was thought not to occur naturally in convenient reservoirs, it is now demonstrated that this is not the case; a hydrogen system is currently being exploited near Bourakebougou, Koulikoro Region in Mali, producing electricity for the surrounding villages. More discoveries of naturally occurring hydrogen in continental, on-shore geological environments have been made in recent years and open the way to the novel field of natural or native hydrogen, supporting energy transition efforts. , almost all (95%) of the world's 70 million tons of hydrogen consumed yearly in industrial processing, significantly in fertilizer for 45% of the world's food, are produced by steam methane reforming (SMR) that also releases the greenhouse gas carbon dioxide.

A possible less-polluting alternative is the newer technology of methane pyrolysis,
 though SMR with carbon capture and storage (CCS) may also greatly reduce carbon emissions.
Small amounts of hydrogen (5%) are produced by the dedicated production of hydrogen from water, usually as a byproduct of the process of generating chlorine from seawater.  there is not enough cheap clean electricity (renewable and nuclear) for this hydrogen to become a significant part of the low-carbon economy, and carbon dioxide is a by-product of the SMR process, but it can be captured and stored.

The idea of hydrogen economy has been heavily criticized from the moment it was proposed. The main issues with the H2E scenario are as follows:
 The human civilization does not have a clean, energy-efficient and low-cost source of H2.  The current production methods either produce a large amount of carbon dioxide per kW than direct burning of coal, or are more expensive or are less energy efficient.
 Storage of H2 within a transportation vehicle for its own motive power faces cost and safety issues.
 Conversion of H2 into electricity in fuel cells have a low (ca. 60%) energy efficiency, with issues of durability and cost remaining unresolved.

Rationale 

In the current hydrocarbon economy, heating is fueled primarily by natural gas and transportation by petroleum. Burning of hydrocarbon fuels emits carbon dioxide and other pollutants. The demand for energy is increasing, particularly in China, India, and other developing countries. Hydrogen can be an environmentally cleaner source of energy to end-users, without release of pollutants such as particulates or carbon dioxide.

Hydrogen has a high energy density by weight but has a low energy density by volume. Even when highly compressed, stored in solids, or liquified, the energy density by volume is only 1/4 that of gasoline, although the energy density by weight is approximately three times that of gasoline or natural gas. Hydrogen can help to decarbonize long-haul transport, chemicals, and iron and steel and has the potential to transport renewable energy long distance and store it long term, for example from wind power or solar electricity.

History 

The term hydrogen economy was coined by John Bockris during a talk he gave in 1970 at General Motors (GM) Technical Center. The concept was proposed earlier by geneticist J.B.S. Haldane.

A hydrogen economy was proposed by the University of Michigan to solve some of the negative effects of using hydrocarbon fuels where the carbon is released to the atmosphere (as carbon dioxide, carbon monoxide, unburnt hydrocarbons, etc.). Modern interest in the hydrogen economy can generally be traced to a 1970 technical report by Lawrence W. Jones of the University of Michigan.

A spike in attention for the concept during the 2000s was repeatedly described as hype by some critics and proponents of alternative technologies. Interest in the energy carrier resurged in the 2010s, notably by the forming of the Hydrogen Council in 2017. Several manufacturers released hydrogen fuel cell cars commercially, with manufacturers such as Toyota and industry groups in China planning to increase numbers of the cars into the hundreds of thousands over the next decade.

Current hydrogen market

Hydrogen production globally was valued at over US$120 billion and is expected to grow over 5% annually through 2028.

This market demand is usually met by pyrolysis of hydrocarbons to produce the hydrogen, which results in  emissions.

 fertiliser production and oil refining are the main uses. About half is used in the Haber process to produce ammonia (NH3), which is then used directly or indirectly as fertilizer. Because both the world population and the intensive agriculture used to support it are growing, ammonia demand is growing. Ammonia can be used as a safer and easier indirect method of transporting hydrogen. Transported ammonia can be then converted back to hydrogen at the bowser by a membrane technology.

The other half of current hydrogen production is used to convert heavy petroleum sources into lighter fractions suitable for use as fuels. This latter process is known as hydrocracking. Hydrocracking represents an even larger growth area, since rising oil prices encourage oil companies to extract poorer source material, such as oil sands and oil shale. The scale economies inherent in large-scale oil refining and fertilizer manufacture make possible on-site production and "captive" use. Smaller quantities of "merchant" hydrogen are manufactured and delivered to end users as well.

 almost (96%) all hydrogen production is from fossil fuels, and emits 900 million tonnes of carbon dioxide per year, a figure theoretically corresponding to 163, but in fact to only 90 million tonnes of dihydrogen per year. The large market and sharply rising prices in fossil fuels have also stimulated great interest in alternate, cheaper means of hydrogen production.

Green hydrogen, from electrolysis of water, is a more economical means of energy storage to address renewable energy intermittency in terms of capital expenditures than pumped-storage hydroelectricity or batteries.

Consumers 
The two major consumers are oil refineries and fertilizer plants (each consumes about half of all production).

Production, storage, infrastructure

, more than 95% of global hydrogen production is sourced from fossil gas and coal without carbon abatement.

Color codes 

Hydrogen is often referred to by various colors to indicate its origin.  As shown below, some production sources have more than one label with the more common listed first. Although the usage of color codes is not standardized, neither is it completely arbitrary.

Methods of production

Molecular hydrogen was discovered in the Kola Superdeep Borehole. It is unclear how much molecular hydrogen is available in natural reservoirs, but at least one company specializes in drilling wells to extract hydrogen. Most hydrogen in the lithosphere is bonded to oxygen in water. Manufacturing elemental hydrogen requires the consumption of a hydrogen carrier such as a fossil fuel or water. The former carrier consumes the fossil resource and in the steam methane reforming (SMR) process produces greenhouse gas carbon dioxide. However, in the newer methane pyrolysis process no greenhouse gas carbon dioxide is produced. These processes typically require no further energy input beyond the fossil fuel. 

Decomposing water, the latter carrier, requires electrical or heat input, generated from some primary energy source (fossil fuel, nuclear power or a renewable energy). Hydrogen produced by zero emission energy sources such as electrolysis of water using wind power, solar power, nuclear power, hydro power, wave power or tidal power is referred to as green hydrogen. When derived from natural gas by zero greenhouse emission methane pyrolysis, it is referred to as turquoise hydrogen.

When fossil fuel derived with greenhouse gas emissions, is generally referred to as grey hydrogen. If most of the carbon dioxide emission is captured, it is referred to as blue hydrogen. Hydrogen produced from coal may be referred to as brown hydrogen.

Current production methods

Steam reforming – gray or blue 

Hydrogen is industrially produced from steam reforming (SMR), which uses natural gas. The energy content of the produced hydrogen is less than the energy content of the original fuel, some of it being lost as excess heat during production. Steam reforming emits carbon dioxide, a greenhouse gas, unless it is captured and stored.

Methane pyrolysis – turquoise 

Pyrolysis of methane (natural gas) with a one-step process bubbling methane through a molten metal catalyst is a "no greenhouse gas" approach to produce hydrogen that was perfected in 2017 and now being tested at scale. The process is conducted at high temperatures (1065 °C). Producing 1 kg of hydrogen requires about 5 kWh of electricity for process heat. The pyrolysis of methane can be expressed by the following reaction equation.

 (g) → C(s) + 2 (g) ΔH° = 74.8 kJ/mol

The industrial quality solid carbon may be sold as manufacturing feedstock or landfilled (no pollution).

Electrolysis of water – green or purple 

Hydrogen can be made via high pressure electrolysis, low pressure electrolysis of water, or a range of other emerging electrochemical processes such as high temperature electrolysis or carbon assisted electrolysis. However, current best processes for water electrolysis have an effective electrical efficiency of 70-80%, so that producing 1 kg of hydrogen (which has a specific energy of 143 MJ/kg or about 40 kWh/kg) requires 50–55 kWh of electricity.

In parts of the world, steam methane reforming is between $1–3/kg on average excluding hydrogen gas pressurization cost. This makes production of hydrogen via electrolysis cost competitive in many regions already, as outlined by Nel Hydrogen and others, including an article by the IEA examining the conditions which could lead to a competitive advantage for electrolysis.

A small part (2% in 2019) is produced by electrolysis using electricity and water, consuming approximately 50 to 55 kilowatt-hours of electricity per kilogram of hydrogen produced.

Kværner process 
The Kværner process or Kvaerner carbon black and hydrogen process (CB&H) is a method, developed in the 1980s by a Norwegian company of the same name, for the production of hydrogen from hydrocarbons (CnHm), such as methane, natural gas and biogas.
Of the available energy of the feed, approximately 48% is contained in the hydrogen, 40% is contained in activated carbon and 10% in superheated steam.

Experimental production methods

Biological production 

Fermentative hydrogen production is the fermentative conversion of organic substrate to biohydrogen manifested by a diverse group of bacteria using multi enzyme systems involving three steps similar to anaerobic conversion. Dark fermentation reactions do not require light energy, so they are capable of constantly producing hydrogen from organic compounds throughout the day and night. Photofermentation differs from dark fermentation because it only proceeds in the presence of light. For example, photo-fermentation with Rhodobacter sphaeroides SH2C can be employed to convert small molecular fatty acids into hydrogen. Electrohydrogenesis is used in microbial fuel cells where hydrogen is produced from organic matter (e.g. from sewage, or solid matter) while 0.2 - 0.8 V is applied.

Biological hydrogen can be produced in an algae bioreactor. In the late 1990s it was discovered that if the algae is deprived of sulfur it will switch from the production of oxygen, i.e. normal photosynthesis, to the production of hydrogen.

Biological hydrogen can be produced in bioreactors that use feedstocks other than algae, the most common feedstock being waste streams. The process involves bacteria feeding on hydrocarbons and excreting hydrogen and CO2. The CO2 can be sequestered successfully by several methods, leaving hydrogen gas. In 2006–2007, NanoLogix first demonstrated a prototype hydrogen bioreactor using waste as a feedstock at Welch's grape juice factory in North East, Pennsylvania (U.S.).

Biocatalysed electrolysis 
Besides regular electrolysis, electrolysis using microbes is another possibility. With biocatalysed electrolysis, hydrogen is generated after running through the microbial fuel cell and a variety of aquatic plants can be used. These include reed sweetgrass, cordgrass, rice, tomatoes, lupines, and algae

High-pressure electrolysis 
High pressure electrolysis is the electrolysis of water by decomposition of water (H2O) into oxygen (O2) and hydrogen gas (H2) by means of an electric current being passed through the water. The difference with a standard electrolyzer is the compressed hydrogen output around 120-200 bar (1740-2900 psi, 12–20 MPa). By pressurising the hydrogen in the electrolyser, through a process known as chemical compression, the need for an external hydrogen compressor is eliminated, the average energy consumption for internal compression is around 3%.
European largest (1 400 000 kg/a, High-pressure Electrolysis of water, alkaline technology) hydrogen production plant is operating at Kokkola, Finland.

High-temperature electrolysis 

Hydrogen can be generated from energy supplied in the form of heat and electricity through high-temperature electrolysis (HTE). Because some of the energy in HTE is supplied in the form of heat, less of the energy must be converted twice (from heat to electricity, and then to chemical form), and so potentially far less energy is required per kilogram of hydrogen produced.

While nuclear-generated electricity could be used for electrolysis, nuclear heat can be directly applied to split hydrogen from water. High temperature (950–1000 °C) gas cooled nuclear reactors have the potential to split hydrogen from water by thermochemical means using nuclear heat. Research into high-temperature nuclear reactors may eventually lead to a hydrogen supply that is cost-competitive with natural gas steam reforming. General Atomics predicts that hydrogen produced in a High Temperature Gas Cooled Reactor (HTGR) would cost $1.53/kg. In 2003, steam reforming of natural gas yielded hydrogen at $1.40/kg. In 2005 natural gas prices, hydrogen costs $2.70/kg.

High-temperature electrolysis has been demonstrated in a laboratory, at 108 MJ (thermal) per kilogram of hydrogen produced, but not at a commercial scale. In addition, this is lower-quality "commercial" grade Hydrogen, unsuitable for use in fuel cells.

Photoelectrochemical water splitting 

Using electricity produced by photovoltaic systems offers the cleanest way to produce hydrogen. Water is broken into hydrogen and oxygen by electrolysis – a photoelectrochemical cell (PEC) process which is also named artificial photosynthesis. William Ayers at Energy Conversion Devices demonstrated and patented the first multijunction high efficiency photoelectrochemical system for direct splitting of water in 1983. This group demonstrated direct water splitting now referred to as an "artificial leaf" or "wireless solar water splitting" with a low cost thin film amorphous silicon multijunction sheet immersed directly in water.

Hydrogen evolved on the front amorphous silicon surface decorated with various catalysts while oxygen evolved off the back metal substrate. A Nafion membrane above the multijunction cell provided a path for ion transport. Their patent also lists a variety of other semiconductor multijunction materials for the direct water splitting in addition to amorphous silicon and silicon germanium alloys. Research continues towards developing high-efficiency multi-junction cell technology at universities and the photovoltaic industry. If this process is assisted by photocatalysts suspended directly in water instead of using photovoltaic and an electrolytic system, the reaction is in just one step, which can improve efficiency.

Photoelectrocatalytic production 
A method studied by Thomas Nann and his team at the University of East Anglia consists of a gold electrode covered in layers of indium phosphide (InP) nanoparticles. They introduced an iron-sulfur complex into the layered arrangement, which when submerged in water and irradiated with light under a small electric current, produced hydrogen with an efficiency of 60%.

In 2015, it was reported that Panasonic Corp. has developed a photocatalyst based on niobium nitride that can absorb 57% of sunlight to support the decomposition of water to produce hydrogen gas. The company plans to achieve commercial application "as early as possible", not before 2020.

Concentrating solar thermal 
Very high temperatures are required to dissociate water into hydrogen and oxygen. A catalyst is required to make the process operate at feasible temperatures. Heating the water can be achieved through the use of water concentrating solar power. Hydrosol-2 is a 100-kilowatt pilot plant at the Plataforma Solar de Almería in Spain which uses sunlight to obtain the required 800 to 1,200 °C to heat water. Hydrosol II has been in operation since 2008. The design of this 100-kilowatt pilot plant is based on a modular concept. As a result, it may be possible that this technology could be readily scaled up to the megawatt range by multiplying the available reactor units and by connecting the plant to heliostat fields (fields of sun-tracking mirrors) of a suitable size.

Thermochemical production 
There are more than 352 thermochemical cycles which can be used for water splitting, around a dozen of these cycles such as the iron oxide cycle, cerium(IV) oxide-cerium(III) oxide cycle, zinc zinc-oxide cycle, sulfur-iodine cycle, copper-chlorine cycle and hybrid sulfur cycle, aluminum aluminum-oxide cycle, are under research and in testing phase to produce hydrogen and oxygen from water and heat without using electricity. These processes can be more efficient than high-temperature electrolysis, typical in the range from 35% - 49% LHV efficiency. Thermochemical production of hydrogen using chemical energy from coal or natural gas is generally not considered, because the direct chemical path is more efficient.

None of the thermochemical hydrogen production processes have been demonstrated at production levels, although several have been demonstrated in laboratories.

Microwaving plastics 
A 97% recovery of hydrogen has been achieved through microwaving plastics for a few seconds that have been ground and mixed with iron oxide and aluminium oxide.

Hydrogen as a byproduct of other chemical processes

The industrial production of chlorine and caustic soda by electrolysis generates a sizable amount of Hydrogen as a byproduct. In the port of Antwerp a 1MW demonstration fuel cell power plant is powered by such byproduct. This unit has been operational since late 2011. The excess hydrogen is often managed with a hydrogen pinch analysis. The world's first hydrogen electric plant, in Italy, had a capacity of 12MW, cost about 6 times more than conventional means, and was shut down in less than two years.

Gas generated from coke ovens in steel production is similar to Syngas with 60% hydrogen by volume. The hydrogen can be extracted from the coke oven gas economically.

Storage

Although molecular hydrogen has very high energy density on a mass basis, partly because of its low molecular weight, as a gas at ambient conditions it has very low energy density by volume. If it is to be used as fuel stored on board the vehicle, pure hydrogen gas must be stored in an energy-dense form to provide sufficient driving range.

Pressurized hydrogen gas

Increasing gas pressure improves the energy density by volume making for smaller container tanks. The standard material for holding pressurised hydrogen in tube trailers is steel (there is no hydrogen embrittlement problem with hydrogen gas). Tanks made of carbon and glass fibres reinforcing plastic as fitted in Toyota Marai and Kenworth trucks are required to meet safety standards. Few materials are suitable for tanks as hydrogen being a small molecule tends to diffuse through many polymeric materials. The most common on board hydrogen storage in today's 2020 vehicles is hydrogen at pressure 700bar = 70MPa. The energy cost of compressing hydrogen to this pressure is significant.

Pressurized gas pipelines are always made of steel and operate at much lower pressures than tube trailers.

Liquid hydrogen

Alternatively, higher volumetric energy density liquid hydrogen or slush hydrogen may be used. However, liquid hydrogen is cryogenic and boils at 20.268 K (–252.882 °C or –423.188 °F). Cryogenic storage cuts weight but requires large liquification energies. The liquefaction process, involving pressurizing and cooling steps, is energy intensive. The liquefied hydrogen has lower energy density by volume than gasoline by approximately a factor of four, because of the low density of liquid hydrogen – there is actually more hydrogen in a litre of gasoline (116 grams) than there is in a litre of pure liquid hydrogen (71 grams). Like any other liquid at cryogenic temperatures, the liquid hydrogen storage tanks must also be well insulated to minimize boil off.

Japan has a liquid hydrogen (LH2) storage facility at a terminal in Kobe, and was expected to receive the first shipment of liquid hydrogen via LH2 carrier in 2020. Hydrogen is liquified by reducing its temperature to -253 °C, similar to liquified natural gas (LNG) which is stored at -162 °C. A potential efficiency loss of 12.79% can be achieved, or 4.26kWh/kg out of 33.3kWh/kg.

Liquid organic hydrogen carriers (LOHC)

Storage as hydride

Distinct from storing molecular hydrogen, hydrogen can be stored as a chemical hydride or in some other hydrogen-containing compound. Hydrogen gas is reacted with some other materials to produce the hydrogen storage material, which can be transported relatively easily. At the point of use the hydrogen storage material can be made to decompose, yielding hydrogen gas. As well as the mass and volume density problems associated with molecular hydrogen storage, current barriers to practical storage schemes stem from the high pressure and temperature conditions needed for hydride formation and hydrogen release.

For many potential systems hydriding and dehydriding kinetics and heat management are also issues that need to be overcome. A French company McPhy Energy is developing the first industrial product, based on Magnesium Hydrate, already sold to some major clients such as Iwatani and ENEL. Emergent hydride hydrogen storage technologies have achieved a compressed volume of less than 1/500.

Adsorption

A third approach is to adsorb molecular hydrogen on the surface of a solid storage material. Unlike in the hydrides mentioned above, the hydrogen does not dissociate/recombine upon charging/discharging the storage system, and hence does not suffer from the kinetic limitations of many hydride storage systems. Hydrogen densities similar to liquefied hydrogen can be achieved with appropriate adsorbent materials. Some suggested adsorbents include activated carbon, nanostructured carbons (including CNTs), MOFs, and hydrogen clathrate hydrate.

Underground hydrogen storage

Underground hydrogen storage is the practice of hydrogen storage in caverns, salt domes and depleted oil and gas fields. Large quantities of gaseous hydrogen have been stored in caverns by ICI for many years without any difficulties. The storage of large quantities of liquid hydrogen underground can function as grid energy storage. The round-trip efficiency is approximately 40% (vs. 75-80% for pumped-hydro (PHES)), and the cost is slightly higher than pumped hydro.

Another study referenced by a European staff working paper found that for large scale storage, the cheapest option is hydrogen at €140/MWh for 2,000 hours of storage using an electrolyser, salt cavern storage and combined-cycle power plant. The European project Hyunder indicated in 2013 that for the storage of wind and solar energy an additional 85 caverns are required as it cannot be covered by PHES and CAES systems.

A German case study on storage of hydrogen in salt caverns found that if the German power surplus (7% of total variable renewable generation by 2025 and 20% by 2050) would be converted to hydrogen and stored underground, these quantities would require some 15 caverns of 500,000 cubic metres each by 2025 and some 60 caverns by 2050 – corresponding to approximately one third of the number of gas caverns currently operated in Germany. In the US, Sandia Labs are conducting research into the storage of hydrogen in depleted oil and gas fields, which could easily absorb large amounts of renewably produced hydrogen as there are some 2.7 million depleted wells in existence.

Power to gas
Power to gas is a technology which converts electrical power to a gas fuel. There are 2 methods, the first is to use the electricity for water splitting and inject the resulting hydrogen into the natural gas grid. The second (less efficient) method is used to convert carbon dioxide and water to methane, (see natural gas) using electrolysis and the Sabatier reaction. The excess power or off peak power generated by wind generators or solar arrays is then used for load balancing in the energy grid. Using the existing natural gas system for hydrogen Fuel cell maker Hydrogenics and natural gas distributor Enbridge have teamed up to develop such a power to gas system in Canada.

Pipeline storage

A natural gas network may be used for the storage of hydrogen. Before switching to natural gas, the UK and German gas networks were operated using towngas, which for the most part consisted of hydrogen. The storage capacity of the German natural gas network is more than 200,000 GWh which is enough for several months of energy requirement. By comparison, the capacity of all German pumped storage power plants amounts to only about 40 GW·h. Similarly UK pumped storage is far less than the gas network. The transport of energy through a gas network is done with much less loss (<0.1%) than in a power network (8%). The use of the existing natural gas pipelines for hydrogen was studied by NaturalHy.

Ad van Wijk, a professor at Future Energy Systems TU Delft, also discusses the possibility of producing electricity in areas or countries with abundant sunlight (Sahara, Chile, Mexico, Namibia, Australia, New Zealand, ...) and transporting it (via ship, pipeline, ...) to the Netherlands. This being economically seen, still cheaper than producing it locally in the Netherlands. He also mentions that the energy transport capacity of gas lines are far higher than that of electricity lines coming into private houses (in the Netherlands) -30 kW vs 3 kW-.

Infrastructure

The hydrogen infrastructure would consist mainly of industrial hydrogen pipeline transport and hydrogen-equipped filling stations like those found on a hydrogen highway. Hydrogen stations which were not situated near a hydrogen pipeline would get supply via hydrogen tanks, compressed hydrogen tube trailers, liquid hydrogen trailers, liquid hydrogen tank trucks or dedicated onsite production.

Over 700 miles of hydrogen pipeline currently exist in the United States. Although expensive, pipelines are the cheapest way to move hydrogen over long distances. Hydrogen gas piping is routine in large oil-refineries, because hydrogen is used to hydrocrack fuels from crude oil.

Hydrogen piping can in theory be avoided in distributed systems of hydrogen production, where hydrogen is routinely made on site using medium or small-sized generators which would produce enough hydrogen for personal use or perhaps a neighborhood. In the end, a combination of options for hydrogen gas distribution may succeed.

Hydrogen embrittlement is not a problem for hydrogen gas pipelines. Hydrogen embrittlement only happens with 'diffusible' hydrogen, i.e. atoms or ions. Hydrogen gas, however, is molecular (H2), and there is a very significant energy barrier to splitting it into atoms.

The IEA recommends existing industrial ports be used for production and existing natural gas pipelines for transport: also international co-operation and shipping.

South Korea and Japan, which as of 2019 lack international electrical interconnectors, are investing in the hydrogen economy. In March 2020, a production facility was opened in Namie, Fukushima Prefecture, claimed to be the world's largest.

A key tradeoff: centralized vs. distributed production
In a future full hydrogen economy, primary energy sources and feedstock would be used to produce hydrogen gas as stored energy for use in various sectors of the economy. Producing hydrogen from primary energy sources other than coal and oil would result in lower production of the greenhouse gases characteristic of the combustion of coal and oil fossil energy resources. The importance of non-polluting methane pyrolysis of natural gas is becoming a recognized method for using current natural gas infrastructure investment to produce hydrogen and no greenhouse gas.

One key feature of a hydrogen economy would be that in mobile applications (primarily vehicular transport) energy generation and use could be decoupled. The primary energy source would need no longer travel with the vehicle, as it currently does with hydrocarbon fuels. Instead of tailpipes creating dispersed emissions, the energy (and pollution) could be generated from point sources such as large-scale, centralized facilities with improved efficiency. This would allow the possibility of technologies such as carbon sequestration, which are otherwise impossible for mobile applications. Alternatively, distributed energy generation schemes (such as small scale renewable energy sources) could be used, possibly associated with hydrogen stations.

Aside from the energy generation, hydrogen production could be centralized, distributed or a mixture of both. While generating hydrogen at centralized primary energy plants promises higher hydrogen production efficiency, difficulties in high-volume, long range hydrogen transportation (due to factors such as hydrogen damage and the ease of hydrogen diffusion through solid materials) makes electrical energy distribution attractive within a hydrogen economy.

In such a scenario, small regional plants or even local filling stations could generate hydrogen using energy provided through the electrical distribution grid or methane pyrolysis of natural gas. While hydrogen generation efficiency is likely to be lower than for centralized hydrogen generation, losses in hydrogen transport could make such a scheme more efficient in terms of the primary energy used per kilogram of hydrogen delivered to the end user.

The proper balance between hydrogen distribution, long-distance electrical distribution and destination converted pyrolysis of natural gas is one of the primary questions that arises about the hydrogen economy.

Again the dilemmas of production sources and transportation of hydrogen can now be overcome using on site (home, business, or fuel station) generation of hydrogen from off grid renewable sources.

Distributed electrolysis 

Distributed electrolysis would bypass the problems of distributing hydrogen by distributing electricity instead. It would use existing electrical networks to transport electricity to small, on-site electrolysers located at filling stations. However, accounting for the energy used to produce the electricity and transmission losses would reduce the overall efficiency.

Uses

Industry 
Steelmaking and ammonia production are industries which may become big users.

In January of 2023, the Swedish mining company LKAB started to discuss converting their steel production to use hydrogen instead of using carbon-based routes.

For heating and cooking instead of natural gas 
Hydrogen can replace some or all of the natural gas in gas grids.  the maximum in a grid is 20%.

Fuel cells as alternative to internal combustion and electric batteries

One of the main offerings of a hydrogen economy is that the fuel can replace the fossil fuel burned in internal combustion engines and turbines as the primary way to convert chemical energy into kinetic or electrical energy, thereby eliminating greenhouse gas emissions and pollution from that engine. Ad van Wijk, a professor at Future Energy Systems TU Delft also mentions that hydrogen is better for larger vehicles - such as trucks, buses and ships - than electric batteries. This because a 1 kg battery, can store 0.1 kWh of energy whereas 1 kg of hydrogen has a usable energy content of 33 kWh.

Although hydrogen can be used in conventional internal combustion engines, fuel cells, being electrochemical, have a theoretical efficiency advantage over heat engines. Fuel cells are more expensive to produce than common internal combustion engines.

Hydrogen gas must be distinguished as "technical-grade" (five nines pure, 99.999%) produced by methane pyrolysis or electrolysis, which is suitable for applications such as fuel cells, and "commercial-grade", which has carbon- and sulfur-containing impurities, but which can be produced by the slightly cheaper steam-reformation process that releases carbon dioxide greenhouse gas. Fuel cells require high-purity hydrogen because the impurities would quickly degrade the life of the fuel cell stack.

Much of the interest in the hydrogen economy concept is focused on the use of fuel cells to power hydrogen vehicles, particularly large trucks. Hydrogen fuel cells suffer from a low power-to-weight ratio. Fuel cells are more efficient than internal combustion engines. If a practical method of hydrogen storage is introduced, and fuel cells become cheaper, they can be economically viable to power hybrid fuel cell/battery vehicles, or purely fuel cell-driven ones. The combination of the fuel cell and electric motor is 2-3 times more efficient than an internal-combustion engine. Capital costs of fuel cells have reduced significantly over recent years, with a modeled cost of $50/kW cited by the Department of Energy.

Other fuel cell technologies based on the exchange of metal ions (e.g. zinc–air fuel cells) are typically more efficient at energy conversion than hydrogen fuel cells, but the widespread use of any electrical energy → chemical energy → electrical energy systems would necessitate the production of electricity.

In the short term hydrogen has been proposed as a method of reducing harmful diesel exhaust. For example, by 2050, the energy requirement for transportation might be between 20% and 30% fulfilled by hydrogen and synthetic fuels.

Safety

Hydrogen has one of the widest explosive/ignition mix range with air of all the gases with few exceptions such as acetylene, silane, and ethylene oxide. This means that whatever the mix proportion between air and hydrogen, when ignited in an enclosed space a hydrogen leak will most likely lead to an explosion, not a mere flame. This makes the use of hydrogen particularly dangerous in enclosed areas such as tunnels or underground parking. Pure hydrogen-oxygen flames burn in the ultraviolet color range and are nearly invisible to the naked eye, so a flame detector is needed to detect if a hydrogen leak is burning. Like natural gas, hydrogen is odorless and leaks cannot be detected by smell. This is the reason odorant chemical is injected into the natural gas to deliver the rotten-egg odor.

Hydrogen codes and standards are codes and standards for hydrogen fuel cell vehicles, stationary fuel cell applications and portable fuel cell applications. There are codes and standards for the safe handling and storage of hydrogen, for example the standard for the installation of stationary fuel cell power systems from the National Fire Protection Association.

Codes and standards have repeatedly been identified as a major institutional barrier to deploying hydrogen technologies and developing a hydrogen economy.  international standards are needed for the transport, storage and traceability of environmental impact.

One of the measures on the roadmap is to implement higher safety standards like early leak detection with hydrogen sensors. The Canadian Hydrogen Safety Program concluded that hydrogen fueling is as safe as, or safer than, compressed natural gas (CNG) fueling. The European Commission has funded the first higher educational program in the world in hydrogen safety engineering at the University of Ulster. It is expected that the general public will be able to use hydrogen technologies in everyday life with at least the same level of safety and comfort as with today's fossil fuels.

Costs

Although much of an existing natural gas grid could be reused with 100% hydrogen, eliminating natural gas from a large area such as Britain would require huge investment. Switching from natural gas to low-carbon heating is more costly if the carbon costs of natural gas are not reflected in its price.

Power plant capacity that now goes unused at night could be used to produce green hydrogen, but this would not be enough; therefore turquoise hydrogen from non-polluting methane pyrolysis or blue hydrogen with carbon capture and storage is needed, possibly after autothermal reforming of methane rather than steam methane reforming.

 green hydrogen costs between $2.50-6.80 per kilogram and turquoise hydrogen $1.40-2.40/kg or blue hydrogen $1.40-2.40/kg compared with high-carbon grey hydrogen at $1–1.80/kg. Deployment of hydrogen can provide a cost-effective option to displace carbon polluting fossil fuels in applications where emissions reductions would otherwise be impractical and/or expensive. These may include heat for buildings and industry, conversion of natural gas-fired power stations, and fuel for aviation and importantly heavy trucks.

In Australia, the Australian Renewable Energy Agency (ARENA) has invested $55 million in 28 hydrogen projects, from early stage research and development to early stage trials and deployments. The agency's stated goal is to produce hydrogen by electrolysis for $2 per kilogram, announced by Minister for Energy and Emissions Angus Taylor in a 2021 Low Emissions Technology Statement.

In August 2021, Chris Jackson quit as chair of the UK Hydrogen and Fuel Cell Association, a leading hydrogen industry association, claiming that UK and Norwegian oil companies had intentionally inflated their cost projections for blue hydrogen in order to maximize future technology support payments by the UK government.

Green hydrogen has become more common in France. A €150 million Green Hydrogen Plan was established in 2019, and it calls for building the infrastructure necessary to create, store, and distribute hydrogen as well as using the fuel to power local transportation systems like buses and trains. Corridor H2, a similar initiative, will create a network of hydrogen distribution facilities in Occitania along the route between the Mediterranean and the North Sea. The Corridor H2 project will get a €40 million loan from the EIB.

Examples and pilot programs 

The distribution of hydrogen for the purpose of transportation is being tested around the world, particularly in the US (California, Massachusetts), Canada, Japan, the EU (Portugal, Norway, Denmark, Germany), and Iceland.

Several domestic U.S. automobile have developed vehicles using hydrogen, such as GM and Toyota. However, as of February 2020, infrastructure for hydrogen was underdeveloped except in some parts of California. The United States have their own hydrogen policy. A joint venture between NREL and Xcel Energy is combining wind power and hydrogen power in the same way in Colorado. Hydro in Newfoundland and Labrador are converting the current wind-diesel Power System on the remote island of Ramea into a Wind-Hydrogen Hybrid Power Systems facility.

A similar pilot project on Stuart Island uses solar power, instead of wind power, to generate electricity. When excess electricity is available after the batteries are fully charged, hydrogen is generated by electrolysis and stored for later production of electricity by fuel cell. The US also have a large natural gas pipeline system already in place.

Countries in the EU which have a relatively large natural gas pipeline system already in place include Belgium, Germany, France, and the Netherlands. In 2020, The EU launched its European Clean Hydrogen Alliance (ECHA).

The UK started a fuel cell pilot program in January 2004, the program ran two Fuel cell buses on route 25 in London until December 2005, and switched to route RV1 until January 2007. The Hydrogen Expedition is currently working to create a hydrogen fuel cell-powered ship and using it to circumnavigate the globe, as a way to demonstrate the capability of hydrogen fuel cells. In August 2021 the UK Government claimed it was the first to have a Hydrogen Strategy and produced a document.

Western Australia's Department of Planning and Infrastructure operated three Daimler Chrysler Citaro fuel cell buses as part of its Sustainable Transport Energy for Perth Fuel Cells Bus Trial in Perth. The buses were operated by Path Transit on regular Transperth public bus routes. The trial began in September 2004 and concluded in September 2007. The buses' fuel cells used a proton exchange membrane system and were supplied with raw hydrogen from a BP refinery in Kwinana, south of Perth. The hydrogen was a byproduct of the refinery's industrial process. The buses were refueled at a station in the northern Perth suburb of Malaga.

Iceland has committed to becoming the world's first hydrogen economy by the year 2050. Iceland is in a unique position. Presently, it imports all the petroleum products necessary to power its automobiles and fishing fleet. Iceland has large geothermal resources, so much that the local price of electricity actually is lower than the price of the hydrocarbons that could be used to produce that electricity.

Iceland already converts its surplus electricity into exportable goods and hydrocarbon replacements. In 2002, it produced 2,000 tons of hydrogen gas by electrolysis, primarily for the production of ammonia (NH3) for fertilizer. Ammonia is produced, transported, and used throughout the world, and 90% of the cost of ammonia is the cost of the energy to produce it.

Neither industry directly replaces hydrocarbons. Reykjavík, Iceland, had a small pilot fleet of city buses running on compressed hydrogen, and research on powering the nation's fishing fleet with hydrogen is under way (for example by companies as Icelandic New Energy). For more practical purposes, Iceland might process imported oil with hydrogen to extend it, rather than to replace it altogether.

The Reykjavík buses are part of a larger program, HyFLEET:CUTE, operating hydrogen fueled buses in eight European cities. HyFLEET:CUTE buses were also operated in Beijing, China and Perth, Australia (see below). A pilot project demonstrating a hydrogen economy is operational on the Norwegian island of Utsira. The installation combines wind power and hydrogen power. In periods when there is surplus wind energy, the excess power is used for generating hydrogen by electrolysis. The hydrogen is stored, and is available for power generation in periods when there is little wind.

India is said to adopt hydrogen and H-CNG, due to several reasons, amongst which the fact that a national rollout of natural gas networks is already taking place and natural gas is already a major vehicle fuel. In addition, India suffers from extreme air pollution in urban areas. According to some estimates, nearly 80% of India's hydrogen is projected to be green, driven by cost declines and new production technologies.
 
Currently however, hydrogen energy is just at the Research, Development and Demonstration (RD&D) stage. As a result, the number of hydrogen stations may still be low, although much more are expected to be introduced soon.

The Turkish Ministry of Energy and Natural Resources and the United Nations Industrial Development Organization have signed a $40 million trust fund agreement in 2003 for the creation of the International Centre for Hydrogen Energy Technologies (UNIDO-ICHET) in Istanbul, which started operation in 2004. A hydrogen forklift, a hydrogen cart and a mobile house powered by renewable energies are being demonstrated in UNIDO-ICHET's premises. An uninterruptible power supply system has been working since April 2009 in the headquarters of Istanbul Sea Buses company.

Another indicator of the presence of large natural gas infrastructures already in place in countries and in use by citizens is the number of natural gas vehicles present in the country. The countries with the largest amount of natural gas vehicles are (in order of magnitude):
Iran, China, Pakistan, Argentina, India, Brasil, Italy, Colombia, Thailand, Uzbekistan, Bolivia, Armenia, Bangladesh, Egypt, Peru, Ukraine, United States. Natural gas vehicles can also be converted to run on hydrogen.

Some hospitals have installed combined electrolyser-storage-fuel cell units for local emergency power. These are advantageous for emergency use because of their low maintenance requirement and ease of location compared to internal combustion driven generators.

Also, in some private homes, fuel cell micro-CHP plants can be found, which can operate on hydrogen, or other fuels as natural gas or LPG. When running on natural gas, it relies on steam reforming of natural gas to convert the natural gas to hydrogen prior to use in the fuel cell. This hence still emits  (see reaction) but (temporarily) running on this can be a good solution until the point where the hydrogen is starting to become distributed through the (natural gas) piping system.

In October 2021, Queensland Premier Annastacia Palaszczuk and Andrew Forrest announced that Queensland will be home to the world's largest hydrogen plant.

German car manufacturer BMW has also been working with hydrogen for years.

Saudi Arabia as a part of the NEOM project, is looking to produce roughly 1.2 million tonnes of green ammonia a year, beginning production in 2025.

Research and development

Timeline of results

Partial hydrogen economy 

Hydrogen is simply a method to store and transmit energy. Energy development of various alternative energy transmission and storage scenarios which begin with hydrogen production, but do not use it for all parts of the store and transmission infrastructure, may be more economic, in both near and far term. These include:

Ammonia economy

An alternative to gaseous hydrogen as an energy carrier is to bond it with nitrogen from the air to produce ammonia, which can be easily liquefied, transported, and used (directly or indirectly) as a clean and renewable fuel. For example, researchers at CSIRO in Australia in 2018 fuelled a Toyota Mirai and Hyundai Nexo with hydrogen separated from ammonia using a membrane technology.  Among disadvantages of ammonia as an energy carrier are its high toxicity, extremely low energy efficiency of NH3 production from N2 and H2, and poisoning of PEM Fuel Cells by traces of non-decomposed NH3 after NH3 to H2 conversion.

Hybrid heat pumps
Hybrid heat pumps (not to be confused with air water hybrids) also include a boiler which could run on methane or hydrogen, and could be a pathway to full decarbonisation of residential heating as the boiler would be used to top up the heating when the weather was very cold.

Bio-SNG
 although technically possible production of syngas from hydrogen and carbon-dioxide from bio-energy with carbon capture and storage (BECCS) via the Sabatier reaction is limited by the amount of sustainable bioenergy available: therefore any bio-SNG made may be reserved for production of aviation biofuel.

See also 

 Alternative fuel
 Energy development
 Fuel Cells and Hydrogen Joint Technology Initiative
 Formic acid
 Hydrogen damage
 Hydrogen embrittlement
 Hydrogen internal combustion engine vehicle
 Hydrogen prize
 Hydrogen-powered aircraft
 International Journal of Hydrogen Energy
 Lolland Hydrogen Community
 Methane pyrolysis
 United States Hydrogen Policy

Notes

References

Sources

Hydrogen. International Energy Agency. 2022

External links

 
 International Partnership for the Hydrogen Economy
 European Hydrogen Association
 Hydrogen energy projects in Australia
 Online calculator for green hydrogen production and transport costs

Bright green environmentalism
Fuel technology
 
Emerging technologies